The 1948–49 BAA season was the Warriors' 3rd season in the NBA.

Draft

Roster

Regular season

Season standings

x – clinched playoff spot

Record vs. opponents

Game log

Playoffs

|- align="center" bgcolor="#ffcccc"
| 1
| March 23
| Washington
| L 70–92
| Jake Bornheimer (13)
| Howie Dallmar (3)
| Philadelphia Arena
| 0–1
|- align="center" bgcolor="#ffcccc"
| 2
| March 24
| @ Washington
| L 78–80
| Chink Crossin (22)
| Jerry Fleishman (3)
| Uline Arena
| 0–2
|-

Awards and records
Joe Fulks, All-NBA First Team

References

Golden State Warriors seasons
Philadelphia